Zinc finger protein 541 is a protein that in humans is encoded by the ZNF541 gene.

References

Further reading 

Human proteins